During the 2018–19 season, CA Osasuna participated in the Segunda División and the Copa del Rey.

Current squad

Competitions

Overall

Segunda División

League table

Copa del Rey

References

CA Osasuna seasons
CA Osasuna